I Hate Myself may refer to:

 I Hate Myself (band), an American band
 Dear God, I Hate Myself, a 2010 album by American indie rock band Xiu Xiu

Songs
 I Hate Myself (for Loving You), a 1987 album by Van Leer
 "I Hate Myself for Loving You," a 1988 song from Joan Jett and the Blackhearts 
 "Me Odio" ("I Hate Myself"), a 2006 song by Gloria Estefan

See also
I Hate You (disambiguation)